A floodplain is a flat land adjacent to a stream or river that experiences flooding during periods of high discharge.

Floodplain may also refer to:
 Floodplain (Kronos Quartet album), 2009
 Floodplain (Sara Groves album) and its title track, 2015
 Flood Plain (painting), a 1986 painting by Andrew Wyeth

See also 
 Floodplain restoration
 Floodplain swamp